HD 1461 b is an extrasolar planet, orbiting the 6th magnitude G-type star HD 1461, 76.5 light years away in the constellation Cetus. This planet has a minimum mass 6.4 times that of Earth and orbits at a distance of 0.0634 AU with an eccentricity of less than 0.131. It is currently unknown whether the planet is a gas giant like Uranus or Neptune, or has terrestrial composition like CoRoT-7 b. This planet was announced on 13 December 2009 after it was discovered using radial velocity measurements taken at the Keck and Anglo-Australian Observatories.

References

Exoplanets discovered in 2009
Super-Earths
Exoplanets detected by radial velocity
Cetus (constellation)